The Prize in the Game is a fantasy novel by Welsh-Canadian writer Jo Walton, published by Tor Books in December 2002. The novel is a prequel to Walton's first two novels, The King's Peace (2000) and The King's Name (2001); its main characters appear as minor or off-stage characters in those books.  The story was loosely inspired by the Táin Bó Cúailnge.

Notes

External links
The King's Peace Page Index Walton's site via the Wayback Machine
Full text of the novel (under CCL)

Reviews

2002 British novels
Welsh fantasy novels
Novels by Jo Walton
Creative Commons-licensed novels
Tor Books books
2002 Canadian novels
Canadian fantasy novels